Aleksandr Mikhailovich Tashayev (born 23 June 1994) is a Russian professional football player who plays as a left midfielder.

Club career
He made his professional debut on 11 December 2014 for FC Dynamo Moscow in a 2014–15 UEFA Europa League group game against PSV Eindhoven. He also played in the Round of 16 away game against Napoli.

On 6 July 2018, he signed a contract with the cross-city rivals FC Spartak Moscow, after buying out own contract from Dynamo and becoming a free agent. Dynamo unsuccessfully sued to deem the buyout clause in his contract invalid.

On 2 September 2019, he joined Rubin Kazan on loan for the rest of the 2019–20 season.

On 3 June 2021, his contract with Spartak was terminated by mutual consent.

On 21 June 2021, he joined Rotor Volgograd, reuniting with his former Dynamo manager Dmitri Khokhlov.

International career
On 11 May 2018, he was included in Russia's extended 2018 FIFA World Cup squad, which was the first time he was called up to the senior national team. He was not included in the finalized World Cup squad.

Career statistics

References

External links
 
 

1994 births
Living people
Footballers from Moscow
Russian footballers
Russia youth international footballers
Russia under-21 international footballers
Association football midfielders
FC Dynamo Moscow players
FC Spartak Moscow players
FC Spartak-2 Moscow players
FC Rubin Kazan players
FC Rotor Volgograd players
Russian Premier League players
Russian First League players